Jabal Al-Oraif  is a mountain in Saudi Arabia, located at 17°19′21″N, 43°19′37″E and is 2632 meters in height above Sea level.

References

Oraif